Peng Fei (born March 6, 1992) is a Chinese Greco-Roman wrestler. He competed in the men's Greco-Roman 85 kg event at the 2016 Summer Olympics, in which he was eliminated in the round of 16 by Javid Hamzatau.

References

External links
 

1992 births
Living people
Chinese male sport wrestlers
Olympic wrestlers of China
Wrestlers at the 2016 Summer Olympics
Asian Games bronze medalists for China
Wrestlers at the 2014 Asian Games
Asian Games medalists in wrestling
Medalists at the 2014 Asian Games
Wrestlers at the 2018 Asian Games
Wrestlers at the 2020 Summer Olympics
21st-century Chinese people